Eric Martin (February 6, 1969October 9, 2002) was an ARCA driver from Hixson, Tennessee, who was killed at the Lowe's Motor Speedway on October 9, 2002, during a practice session for the season-ending EasyCare 100.

He was not related to Mark Martin despite sharing a same last name.

Martin initially spun and backed into the fourth turn wall, coming to rest on the racing line entering the tri-oval. A fairly routine and innocuous accident, Martin radioed his crew that he was fine. However, 16 seconds after the initial crash, just as Martin was unbuckling his belts, Deborah Renshaw, going full speed along the racing line in the belief that the track was clear, careened directly into the driver's side door of Martin at about 160 mph and killed him instantly.

Both ARCA and Renshaw were roundly criticized following the accident. ARCA received criticism because its regulations did not require spotters to be located on top of the grandstands. Renshaw's spotter was standing on top of the team trailer, and thus could not see the wreck and communicate its location to his driver. Thus, in spite of the fact that 16 seconds, an eternity in racing, passed between the initial crash and the fatal second collision, not all the drivers were notified of the crash. Renshaw was herself  criticized because although several other cars with similarly situated spotters, managed to see Martin in time and slow considerably before avoiding him, Renshaw did not see the car stopped on the racing line until it was much too late to avoid the fatal collision. In the aftermath of the accident, ARCA mandated that each car that went onto the track had to have an assigned spotter in the spotter's stand, and a yellow warning light was mandated for the car's dashboard that illuminated when a caution was declared on the race track. 
Eric left behind two sons, Brian and Matt Martin.

Martin had 40 starts in the ARCA Re/Max Series.



Motorsports career results

ARCA Re/Max Series
(key) (Bold – Pole position awarded by qualifying time. Italics – Pole position earned by points standings or practice time. * – Most laps led.)

References

External links
 

1969 births
2002 deaths
ARCA Menards Series drivers
Filmed deaths in motorsport
People from Hamilton County, Tennessee
Racing drivers from Tennessee
Racing drivers who died while racing
Sports deaths in North Carolina